Orji Kalu Okogbue (born 9 February 1992) is a Nigerian footballer who plays as a centre-back for Mouloudia Oujda in the Moroccan Botola.

Honours

Club

Tirana
 Albanian Supercup: (1) 2017

References

External links
 
 

1992 births
Living people
Nigerian footballers
Nigeria international footballers
Nigerian expatriate footballers
Association football central defenders
Heartland F.C. players
Rangers International F.C. players
Kano Pillars F.C. players
KF Tirana players
MC Oujda players
Kategoria Superiore players
Botola players
Nigerian expatriate sportspeople in Albania
Nigerian expatriate sportspeople in Morocco
Expatriate footballers in Albania
Expatriate footballers in Morocco
Sportspeople from Jos
Nigeria A' international footballers
2016 African Nations Championship players